The list of ship launches in 1675 includes a chronological list of some ships launched in 1675.


References

1675
Ship launches